Etchen may refer to:

 Frederick Etchen, a 1924 Olympic sport shooter
 Saint Etchen, an Irish saint
 South Coffeyville, Oklahoma, formerly named Etchen in 1909 after local John P. Etchen